Streetart Festival Istanbul is Turkey's first  annual street art and post-graffiti festival. The festival was founded by artist and graphics designer Pertev Emre Tastaban in 2007.

History

2009 
From June 12–13, 2009, the first festival took place in the Galata area in Beyoğlu. For the Morphosis group exhibition, the abandoned "Banker Han" building was adapted by 45 participating musicians, graffiti, and street artists.

Participating artists included: Bay Perşembe & Sebeke, Bomba Fonda, Bonan, Cins, Copikstar, Cype, Das Metal, Deniz m. örnek, Emr3, Eskreyn, Fly Propaganda, Gogo, Hikmet Vandal, Iac, Ini, Kırdök+1, Lakormis, Madcat, Mateman,Mmurat Başol, Nenuka, Osman, Pet05, RR, Kedü, Kuyara, Rad, S2k Wide, Yeni Anıt, MC's Fuat & Apo, Gaia, Saltyspinzitfunky, Deniz K., Tai Fu, Deform-e, and Sonashine.

2010 
Ne yersen o'sun streetart graffiti painting exhibition.

The concept about Genetic played "organismas that we ate", at Maslak in a 500 m2 field and 10 meters high. It was covered in murals. Nine street artists participated in the exhibit. On opening night U.F.U.K performed. 650 attended. Artists were: Pet05, Street Projects/Omeria /Jellyfishandroyale/Fiberoptik/Sunya Atay/Bayan Anderson/Cuneyt Celik/Insan Taklidi /Zamanevvel.

In 2010's festival munich scene participated, around the city outer walls painted and at nayah festival opened with 4 floors painting and live performance from express brass band (munich)

Form Germany came Blash, Kiam77, Loomit, Neon, One2, Rosanna Schumacher, Ssatone, Skore183, Ssquaredynamic. Turkey added Asu Ceren, Cuneyt Celik, Cooper, Dünya Atay, Eskreyn, Iberoptik, Flypropaganda, Fu, Funk, Goksu Gul, Jellyfishandroyale, Kmr, Küf Project, Levent Bozkurt, Mekazoo, Miray özcan, Nnuka, Omeria, Pet05, Shione, Sesin çıksın, Tabone, Techone, Yeni Anıt, Zoe, Wicx, and Choma. The music was provided by Express Brass Band. Istanbul sent A.P.O & Yener & 9 Canlı, Deniz K., and Deform-e.

External links
 Street Art Istanbul
 Street Art Festival istanbul blog
 Street Art Festival Istanbul, Fan Page
 New York Times
 Akşam Newspaper
 Street Art Festival Istanbul - Streetart Istanbul 2010
 Street Art in Istanbul pictures
 facebook istanbul guide

References

Festivals in Istanbul
Street art festivals
2007 establishments in Turkey